Raphaël Lecomte (born 22 May 1988) is a French footballer who plays as a midfielder for Belgian fifth-tier Belgian Division 3 club RSC Habay-la-Neuve.

Career

Lecomte started his career with Navalcarnero in the Spanish third division after playing for the youth academy of French Ligue 1 side Saint-Étienne.

In 2009, he signed for Belgian third division club Visé, but left due to financial problems.

In 2013, Lecomte signed for Westerlo in the Belgian second division, where he made 75 appearances and scored 8 goals.

In 2018, he signed for Belgian third division team Virton.

References

External links
 
 

1988 births
People from Guingamp
Sportspeople from Côtes-d'Armor
Footballers from Brittany
Living people
French footballers
Association football midfielders
CDA Navalcarnero players
C.S. Visé players
K.V.C. Westerlo players
K.S.V. Roeselare players
R.E. Virton players
K.M.S.K. Deinze players
Segunda División B players
Belgian Pro League players
Challenger Pro League players
Belgian National Division 1 players
French expatriate footballers
Expatriate footballers in Spain
French expatriate sportspeople in Spain
Expatriate footballers in Belgium
French expatriate sportspeople in Belgium